This is a list of notable non-governmental organizations working in Vietnam or connected with Vietnam.

A

B

 Blue Dragon Children's Foundation
 Bread for the World
 Bremen Overseas Research and Development Association
 Bridge Asia Japan
 Bright Future Group for People with Disabilities

C

D

 Danish Red Cross
 Daughters of Charity of Saint Vincent de Paul

E

 East Meets West Foundation
 English Language Institute

F

G

 Global Village Foundation (GVF)
 Global Civic Sharing
 Groupe de Recherches et d'Echanges Technologiques

H

I

J

 Japan International Volunteer Center
 Japanese Association of Supporting Streetchildren

K
 Konrad Adenauer Foundation
 KNCV Tuberculosis Foundation

L

 Lutheran Church–Missouri Synod World Mission
 Living Values Education Program

M

N
 NLR - until No Leprosy Remains
 Nordic Assistance to Vietnam
 Norwegian Mission Alliance
 Norwegian Red Cross

O

P

Q

 Quaker Service American Friends Service Committee

R
 Red Cross of Viet Nam

S

T

 Terre des hommes Foundation - Lausanne
 The Alliance for Safe Children (TASC)
 The Global Fund to Fight AIDS, Tuberculosis and Malaria
 The Library Project
 The World Conservation Union
 TRAFFIC International in Indochina

U

 UNICEF
 United Nations Volunteers

V

W

Y
 Young Lives Vietnam
 Youth with a Mission - Mercy, Relief and Development Asia

NGO Vietnam